Noppawit Hengkrathok (born 28 August 2001) is a member of the Thailand men's national volleyball team.

Clubs
  Nakhon Ratchasima (2021–)

References

Thai men's volleyball players
2001 births
Living people
21st-century Thai people